Mary Elizabeth Anderson (February 19, 1866 – June 27, 1953) was an American real estate developer, rancher, viticulturist, and inventor of the windshield wiper blade. On November 10, 1903 Anderson was granted her first patent for an automatic car window cleaning device controlled from inside the car, called the windshield wiper.

Early life
Mary Anderson was born in Burton Hill Plantation, Greene County, Alabama, at the start of Reconstruction in 1866. Her parents were John C. and Rebecca Anderson. Anderson was one of at least two daughters. The other daughter was Fannie, who remained close to Anderson all her life. Their father died in 1870, and the young family was able to live on the proceeds of John’s estate. In 1889 she moved with her widowed mother and sister to the booming town of Birmingham, Alabama. Anderson’s education is unknown. She was never married and did not have any children.

In Birmingham, Anderson became a real estate developer soon after settling and built the Fairmont Apartments on Highland Avenue. In 1893, Anderson left Birmingham to operate a cattle ranch and vineyard in Fresno, California. In 1898, she returned to Birmingham to help care for an ailing aunt. Anderson and her aunt moved into the Fairmont Apartments with Anderson’s mother, her sister Fannie, and Fannie’s husband G. P. Thornton. Anderson’s ailing aunt brought a trunk with her that contained a collection of gold and jewelry. From that time forward, Anderson’s family lived comfortably.

Invention (windshield wipers) 
In a visit to New York City in the winter of 1902, Anderson sat in a trolley car on a frosty day. Anderson observed that the trolley car driver struggled to see past the windows because of the falling sleet. The trolley car’s front window was designed for bad-weather visibility, but its multi-pane windshield system worked very poorly. Therefore, to clear the sights, the driver needed to open the window, lean out of the vehicle, or stop the car to go outside in order to wipe the windscreen with his hands. Anderson, who was not an engineer but an entrepreneur, identified the problem and its opportunity. She envisioned a windshield wiper blade that the trolley driver could operate from the inside. At that time, it rarely occurred to anyone else to eliminate the problem. It was something drivers simply accepted and dealt with.

When she returned to Alabama she hired a designer for a hand-operated device to keep a windshield clear and had a local company produce a working model. She applied for, and in 1903 was granted, a 17-year patent for a windshield wiper. The patent application was filed on June 18, 1903. On November 10, 1903, the United States Patent Office awarded Anderson patent number 743,801 for her Window Cleaning device.

Her device consisted of a lever inside the vehicle that controlled a rubber blade on the outside of the windshield. The lever could be operated to cause the spring-loaded arm to move back and forth across the windshield. A counterweight was used to ensure contact between the wiper and the window. The device could be easily removed if desired after the winter was over. Similar devices had been made earlier, but Anderson's was the first windshield clearing device to be effective. Anderson’s simple mechanism and basic design have remained much the same, but unlike today’s windscreen wipers, Anderson’s could be removed when not needed.

In 1903 when Anderson applied for the patent, cars were not very popular. Henry Ford’s Model A automobile had not been manufactured yet. Therefore, when Anderson tried to sell the rights to her invention through a noted Canadian firm of Dinning and Eckenstein in 1905, they rejected her application. They argued, "we do not consider it to be of such commercial value as would warrant our undertaking its sale." Furthermore, many could not see the value of her invention and stressed the risk that the driver would be distracted by operating the device and the moving wipers.

By 1913 the automobile manufacturing business had grown exponentially and windshield wipers were standard equipment. In 1922, Cadillac became the first car manufacturer to adopt them as standard equipment. However, Anderson never profited from her invention, the patent expiring in 1920.

In 1917, Charlotte Bridgewood patented the “electric storm windshield cleaner,” the first automatic wiper system that used rollers instead of blades. Like Anderson, Bridgewood never made any money from her invention. Sara-Scott Wingo, rector of Emmanuel Episcopal Church in Richmond, Va., and Anderson’s great-great niece suspect Anderson’s invention never went anywhere because Anderson was an independent woman. Wingo said in an interview with NPR News, “She didn't have a father. She didn't have a husband. And the world was kind of run by men back then.”

Later life 
By the 1920s, Anderson’s brother-in-law had died, and Anderson was again living in the Fairmont Apartments in Birmingham with her sister Fannie and her mother. She continued to manage the Fairmont Apartments until her death at the age of 87. At the time of her death, she was the oldest member of South Highland Presbyterian Church. She died at her summer home in Monteagle, Tennessee. Her funeral was conducted by Dr. Frank A. Mathes at South Highland and she was buried at Elmwood Cemetery.

Popular culture
Anderson's invention of the windshield wiper helped people so they did not have to use a rag.
Marge: "Well, a woman also invented the windshield wiper!"
Homer: "Which goes great with another male invention, the car!" -Simpsons

Anderson's windshield wiper invention is also briefly mentioned on the British panel/quiz show; QI (Quite Interesting); Season 10, Episode 16 - "Just the Job".

"When was the windshield wiper invented?" was the Weather Channel "Question of the Day" for July 6, 2016.

NPR's Morning Edition produced a profile, including an interview with her great-great-niece into her legacy and societal context on July 25, 2017.

Legacy
In 2011 Anderson was inducted into the National Inventors Hall of Fame.

References

External links
Mary Anderson entry on About.com 
Famous Women Inventors

1866 births
1953 deaths
People from Greene County, Alabama
20th-century American inventors
American viticulturists
Businesspeople from Birmingham, Alabama
People from Monteagle, Tennessee
Women inventors
American automotive pioneers
Burials at Elmwood Cemetery (Birmingham, Alabama)
Inventors from Alabama